The State Ministry of Foreign Employment Promotions and Market Diversification  is a ministry in the Government of Sri Lanka  responsible “for converting the entire labour migration sector into a demand driven process and make it highly competitive by introducing required structural changes together with necessary promotional and welfare activities to meet the international market challenges considering the importance of its contribution to the national economy.”

List of ministers

The State Minister of Foreign Employment Promotions and Market Diversification is an appointment in the Cabinet of Sri Lanka.

Parties
Sri Lanka Freedom Party

United National Party

Sri Lanka Podu Jana Peramuna

See also
 List of ministries of Sri Lanka

References

External links
 State Ministry of Foreign Employment Promotions and Market Diversification
 Government of Sri Lanka

Ministry of Foreign Employment
Ministry of Foreign Employment